Tony Walsh may refer to:

 Tony Walsh (footballer) (1928–1984), Australian rules footballer
 Tony Walsh (poet) (born 1965), English poet, performer and writer
 Tony Walsh (priest) (born 1954), Irish Roman Catholic priest convicted of child sexual abuse

See also
 Anthony Walsh (disambiguation)